The 2013 Men's EuroHockey Championship was the 14th edition of the men's EuroHockey Nations Championship, the biennial international men's field hockey championship of Europe organized by the European Hockey Federation. It was held alongside the women's tournament from 17 until 25 August 2013 in Boom, Belgium. The main sponsor for the tournament was TriFinance

Germany defeated Belgium in the final to win their eighth title and they earned their qualification to the 2014 World Cup.

Qualified teams

Format
The eight teams were split into two groups of four teams. The top two teams advanced to the semifinals to determine the winner in a knockout system. The bottom two teams played in a new group against the teams they did not play in the group stage. The last two teams were relegated to the EuroHockey Championship II.

Squads

Results
The match schedule was released on 24 January 2013.

All times are local (UTC+2).

Preliminary round

Pool A

Pool B

Fifth to eighth place classification

Pool C
The points obtained in the preliminary round against the other team were taken over.

First to fourth place classification

Semi-finals

Third and fourth place

Final

Statistics

Final standings

 Qualified for the 2014 World Cup

 Qualified for the 2014 World Cup as hosts

 Relegated to the EuroHockey Championship II

Awards
Best Player of the Tournament:  Robbert Kemperman
Best goalkeeper of the Tournament:  Filip Neusser
Topscorer of the Tournament:  Eduard Tubau

Goalscorers

References

External links
Official website

 
Men's EuroHockey Nations Championship
Men 1
EuroHockey Nations Championship Men
International field hockey competitions hosted by Belgium
EuroHockey Championship Men
Sport in Boom, Belgium
EuroHockey Championship